John Peel   (4 February 1804 – 2 April 1872) was an English Liberal Party politician.

Peel was the son of Thomas Peel of Peelfold. He was educated at Manchester Grammar School, and became a merchant.

Peel was elected as a Member of Parliament (MP) for Tamworth at a by-election in October 1863,
following the succession to the peerage of the Liberal MP Viscount Raynham.
He was re-elected in 1865,
but was defeated at the 1868 general election by Henry Bulwer.

When Bulwer was elevated to the peerage in 1871, Peel was elected unopposed
in his place,
and held the seat until his own death in April 1872,
aged 68.

Peel was also a Justice of the Peace for Warwickshire and Staffordshire.

References

External links 
 

1804 births
1872 deaths
Liberal Party (UK) MPs for English constituencies
UK MPs 1859–1865
UK MPs 1865–1868
UK MPs 1868–1874
People educated at Manchester Grammar School
English justices of the peace
19th-century English businesspeople